Georg Waaler (21 March 1895 – 27 February 1983) was a Norwegian physician, a professor of forensic medicine, and chairman of the Norwegian Board of Forensic Medicine.

Personal life
Waaler was born in Hamar on 21 March 1895 to physician Peder Ferdinand Waaler and musician Fredrikke Amalie Holtemann Rynning, and was a brother of Rolf and Erik Waaler. In 1920 he married Sophie Amalie Koller.

Career
Waaler was appointed professor in forensic medicine at the University of Oslo from 1938 to 1965. He chaired the Norwegian Board of Forensic Medicine from 1946 to 1965.

References

1895 births
1983 deaths
People from Hamar
20th-century Norwegian physicians
Academic staff of the University of Oslo
Members of the Norwegian Academy of Science and Letters